Residential zone can refer to:

 Residential area, an area zoned for residential development
 Residential zoning, the practice of designating an area for residential development